Colonel Peter Vroman (March 20, 1736 – December 29, 1793) was an American Revolutionary War soldier from Schoharie, New York.  
He was a colonel in the 15th regiment of the Albany County militia.  He is buried in the Old Stone Fort cemetery in Schoharie, New York.  
His home is next door to the Schoharie Bridge near the intersection of NY Route 30 and Route 443, also known as "Vromans Corners".

References

1736 births
1793 deaths
People using the U.S. civilian title colonel
American people of Dutch descent
New York (state) militiamen in the American Revolution
People from Schoharie, New York